Carabus planicollis is a species of black coloured ground beetle from Carabinae subfamily that is endemic to Romania.

Subspecies include:
 Carabus planicollis planicollis
 Carabus planicollis verae

References

planicollis
Beetles described in 1827
Endemic fauna of Romania